Daniel Jelišić (born 18 February 2000) is a German-Bosnian footballer who plays as a midfielder for FC Pipinsried.

Club career
Jelišić made his professional debut for FC Juniors OÖ in the Austrian Football Second League on 16 August 2019, coming on as a substitute in the 81st minute for Fabian Benko against Wacker Innsbruck, with the away match finishing as a 2–1 loss.

Personal life
Jelišić's older brother, Nikola, is also a footballer.

References

External links
 
 
 
 
 Profile - ÖFB

2000 births
Living people
Footballers from Munich
German people of Bosnia and Herzegovina descent
German people of Serbian descent
Association football midfielders
German footballers
LASK players
FC Juniors OÖ players
FC Pipinsried players
2. Liga (Austria) players
Regionalliga players
German expatriate footballers
Expatriate footballers in Austria
German expatriate sportspeople in Austria